The Lafayette Hotel, Swim Club & Bungalows is a hotel in San Diego, California, United States that opened .

The Lafayette's original name was Imig Manor, owned by local entrepreneur Larry Imig.  The Lafayette was originally built at a cost of $2 million on El Cajon Boulevard.  When Imig Manor opened in 1946, its first guest was Bob Hope; other celebrities followed. “The buildings and the pool are steeped in the history of Hollywood’s heyday, the 1940s and ’50s,” according to the developer.

By 1960, Interstate 8 replaced El Cajon Boulevard as the main east-west connector of San Diego, and hotel operations ceased due to the loss of through traffic on El Cajon Boulevard. The building was passed through several owners, until Hampstead Lafayette Partners purchased  in North Park, including the Lafayette Hotel, for $11.5 million in March 2004. Hampstead Partners is restoring the Lafayette as a boutique hotel. In 2010 a year-long, $4 million facelift was announced, aided by a $2.4 million loan from the city's Redevelopment Agency. District 3 City Councilmember Todd Gloria called the revitalization a return to the hotel's “glamour and opulence.” The hotel has been closed since Fall of 2022 for extensive renovations including upgrades for the guest rooms and the addition of eight new restaurants and bars. Construction is expected to be complete by Summer of 2023.

The hotel has a swimming pool designed by Johnny Weissmuller, a ballroom, and 141 guest suites, each named for a great name in film history.

In popular culture
The Lafayette Hotel served as a film set for the feature film Top Gun.

References

External links 

 The Lafayette Hotel, Swim Club & Bungalows
 The Boulevard
 preservation site

Hotels in San Diego
Economy of San Diego
Hotels established in 1946
Hotel buildings completed in 1946
National Register of Historic Places in San Diego
1946 establishments in California